Brachyopa pilosa is a European species of hoverflies.

References

Diptera of Europe
Eristalinae
Insects described in 1939
Taxa named by James Edward Collin